Cumbres de San Bartolomé is a city located in the province of Huelva, Spain. According to the 2006 census, the city has a population of 500 inhabitants.

Demographics

References

External links
Cumbres de San Bartolomé - Sistema de Información Multiterritorial de Andalucía

Municipalities in the Province of Huelva